The collection of the Metropolitan Museum of Art contains a lidded saltceller. Crafted in either 15th or 16th century Sierra Lione, the item is on view at The Met Fifth Avenue in Gallery 352.

Background 
Ivory carving was a traditional part of West African art. In what is now Sierra Leone, the Sapi people were noted for producing ivory pieces for export. When Portuguese traders began to establish themselves in enclaves on the ivory and grain coasts in the late 15th century, they began to commission local artisans to produce intricately-designed ivory vessels, receptacles, and boxes for export to Europe. Given the valuable nature of ivory, these containers were typically only used to hold valuable goods, such as salt, pepper, and other spices, all of which the nascent Portuguese Empire was quickly gaining access to through its widening trade network. The result of these trade relations was a mixing of Portuguese and Sapi artistic tradition, creating an Afro-Portuguese style of art. This hybridization resulted in works of art that contained symbols, motifs, and imagery derived from both the Sapi and the Portuguese.

Description 
The lidded salt cellar dates to either the late 15th century or the 16th century. The work is made from carved ivory and bone, and was used to hold salt. Three snakes, a symbol of wealth among the Sapi, decorate the container, while four snarling dogs are seen to be confronting the snakes. Notably, the dogs (themselves a symbol of the spiritual world to the Sapi) are depicted in a European style similar to medieval hunting manuscripts, indicating a crossing of artistic traditions.

References 

Sculptures of the Metropolitan Museum of Art